John Sinnott (1829-1896) was an Irish recipient of the Victoria Cross.

John Sinnott may also refer to:
 John Sinnott (American football) (born 1958)
 John Sinnott (politician) (1905-1960), Canadian MP
 John Sinnott SJ (active 1948), rector of Beaumont College, Berkshire, England
 John T. Sinnott (born 1948), American physician, scientist, and business executive

See also
 John Sinnott Elementary School, Milpitas, California
 John Synnott (1895-?), Irish Gaelic footballer